The Schmachter See and Fangerien Nature Reserve is a nature reserve in the German state of Mecklenburg-Western Pomerania and covers an area of 262 hectares. It was placed under conservation protection on 7 December 1994 with the goal of preserving and cultivating a section of the East Rügen hill country together with a silted lake and adjacent wet meadows, bogs and woods.

The lake of Schmachter See lies immediately southwest of Binz. The village of Schmacht that lent the lake its name lies near the western shore of the lake. The nature reserve borders to the south on the parish of Serams and the B 196 federal road. The Fangerien is a beech wood on the northwestern shore of the lake. The condition of the woods is graded as "good". The poor state of the Schmachter See was improved as part of a major conservation project, the East Rügen Bodden Country (Ostrügensche Boddenlandschaft), which implemented re-naturalisation measures.

Literature

References

External links 

Nature reserve act
Regional concept on the pages of the German Federal Foundation for the Environment
M-V environmental map portal with geodata  (reserve boundaries, biotope mapping etc.)

Schmachter See and Fangerien
Geography of Rügen
Protected areas established in 1994
1994 establishments in Germany